Ivan Petrovich Argunov (1729–1802) was a Russian painter, one of the founders of the Russian school of portrait painting.

Biography
He was a serf belonging to Count Sheremetev and had grown up in the family of his uncle, Semyon Mikhaylovich Argunov, who was a steward of princess Cherkassky and later a majordomo for count Sheremetev. For many years Semyon managed Sheremetev's house on Millionnaya Street in Saint Petersburg, the house where Ivan grew up.

In 1746–1749 Ivan Argunov studied painting with a German artist named Georg Grooth who at the time was in the employ of the Empress Elizabeth of Russia. Ivan also got lessons from his cousins Fedor Leontyevich Argunov and Fedor Semenovich Argunov, painters working in Saint-Petersburg on decorating the Imperial residences.

Argunov's first works were icons for the Palace Church in Great Tsarskoe Selo Palace (1753) and for the New Jerusalem Monastery (1749). At that time he also created his only known historical painting Dying Cleopatra. His earliest known portraits were of Prince Ivan Ivanovich Lobanov-Rostovsky (1752) and Princess Ekaterina Alexandrovna Lobanova-Rostovskaya (1754).  There can be seen the old traditions of traditional Russian Parsuna art mixed with the new Baroque influence.

In 1760s Argunov was in his prime. He created many beautiful parade and psychological portraits and icons. Among his subjects were Russian royalty and of course Argunov's masters the Sheremetevs as well as their relatives the Lazarevs and the counts Tolstoy. He was one of the creators of the genre of posthumous portraits, painting many dead Sheremetevs.

In 1770 Argunov became the major-domo for the Sheremetevs' house on Millionnaya Street, then the major-domo of the Moscow house of the Sheremetevs, then one of the stewards for their estates (chlen krepostnoj kollegii grafov Sheremetevs). He painted much less but it was in that time (1784) he created his masterpiece  Portrait of an Unknown Woman in Peasant Dress. The identity of the sitter for the painting remains uncertain, whilst studies have suggested that she was the serf actress and singer of the counts Sheremetev, Anna Kovalyova-Zhemchugova, it has equally been supposed that it was not in fact an official portrait of her, but rather an image of an unidentified wet nurse, taken from amongst the Seremetevs' serfs. Between the second half of 1780s until his death in 1802 Argunov did not paint but spent all his time managing different estates and businesses of the Sheremetevs.

Argunov was an important teacher of art. He taught painting classes beginning in 1753 — before the opening of the Imperial Academy of Arts in 1757. Among his students were Anton Losenko, Fyodor Rokotov, Kirill Golovachevsky and Ivan Sablukov — all four future teachers of the Academy. Argunov's sons were also his pupils. Two of them: (Nikolay Argunov and Yakov Argunov) became painters, while the third (Pavel Argunov) became an architect.

Selected works

See also
 List of Russian artists

References

Sources 

 

Natalia Presnova All Argunovs 
 Artvibrations Archive: https://web.archive.org/web/20110707171525/http://www.artvibrations.com/IvanPetrovichArgunov/

External links

Biography and works  

Painters from the Russian Empire
Russian portrait painters
18th-century painters from the Russian Empire
Russian male painters
Russian serfs
1729 births
1802 deaths
Painters from Saint Petersburg